Sydney-Denison was an electoral district of the Legislative Assembly in the Australian state of New South Wales, created in 1894 from part of the electoral district of West Sydney in the Ultimo area and named after Governor Denison.

Members for Sydney-Denison

History
Multi-member constituencies were abolished in the 1893 redistribution, resulting in the creation of 76 new districts, including Sydney-Denison. Sydney-Denison consisted of a southern part of the four member district of West Sydney. It was to the south of Darling Harbour, bounded on the east by George Street, in the south by George St West, in the west by Bay Street and Wattle Street, Sydney and by Fig St across to Darling Harbour. In 1904 it was abolished and absorbed into the district of Pyrmont.

Election results

References

Former electoral districts of New South Wales
Constituencies established in 1894
1894 establishments in Australia
Constituencies disestablished in 1904
1904 disestablishments in Australia